Galia Yishai (17 May 1950 – 4 January 2020) was an Israeli actress of film, stage and television and singer. She began performing from the age of 16-and-a-half on the radio programme  and acted on stage at most of Israel's repertoire theatres such as the Habima Theatre, the Bimot Theatre, the Cameri Theater, Haifa Theatre and Beit Lessin Theater. Yishai acted in several film and television programmes from 1971 to her death in 2020.

Early life and education
On 17 May 1950, Yishai was born in Tel Aviv. Her mother worked in advertising and her father was an Etzel fighter who co-established the Freedom Movement. Yishai had two siblings and grew up in Tel Aviv. Following her graduation from high school, she went to the Beit Zvi School for the Performing Arts.

Career
Yishai began her career at the age of 16-and-a-half when she earned acceptance to perform on the radio show  and performed a song in the programme's chorus troupe. She was a military graduate of the Central Command Band, having spent three-and-a-half years there, and performing in its  programme in 1969. Yishai then continued to study acting at Tel Aviv University and in New York. 

Upon being released from the Central Command troupe, Yishai joined the cast of the Habima Theatre. She also worked in most Israeli repertoire theatres, including with the Bimot Theatre, the Cameri Theater, Haifa Theatre and Beit Lessin Theater. In 1970, she joined the female Fourth Girls of the Theater Club troupe and performed alongside Hana Laszlo,  and Adi Lev and also worked opposite her friend . Yishai also performed on stage in foreign countries such as France, Switzerland and the United States. 

Yishai was a writer of songs, and was signed to the CBS Records International record label. Yishai lent her voice as the narrator of classical music records for children such as Ludwig van Beethoven, Frédéric Chopin, Richard Strauss and Wolfgang Amadeus Mozart, and with the actor , was on the classical children's records Trip in the Land of the Notes, Tiff and Taff Numbers and Klesitaf. She authored a children's illustrated poet book, Ketesh Choshem, in 1979.

She also worked as an actress in both film and television. She and Mor were part of the programme Moment and Waves for several years.

Death
On 4 January 2020, aged 69, Yishai died at Tel Aviv Sourasky Medical Center, approximately one month after being diagnosed with cancer. Her funeral took place at Yarkon Cemetery in Petah Tikva on the afternoon of the following day.

References

External links

 
 

1950 births
2020 deaths
Actresses from Tel Aviv
Musicians from Tel Aviv
20th-century Israeli actresses
21st-century Israeli actresses
20th-century Israeli women singers
21st-century Israeli women singers
Tel Aviv University alumni
Israeli puppeteers
Israeli film actresses
Israeli television actresses
Israeli stage actresses
Deaths from cancer in Israel
Burials at Yarkon Cemetery